Abdulmumini Kabir Usman is a Fulani from the Sullubawa  Clan and the Emir of Katsina, Nigeria, and chancellor of University of Ilorin (He was former Chancellor of Obafemi Awolowo University).
He is the 50th emir of Katsina chronologically and the 4th from Sullubawa dynasty succeeding his father Muhammadu Kabir Usman.

He was born on January 9, 1952.

References

1952 births
Living people
Emirs of Katsina
Nigerian Muslims
Obafemi Awolowo University people
University of Ilorin people